Paul John Ward (born 7 May 1964 in Oxford, Oxfordshire) is a British racing car driver. He made his debut in the Porsche Club Championship in 2011 racing a Porsche 968 Clubsport. He has held a Race National Licence since 2012.

Personal life
Ward is a Chartered Engineer, a Fellow of the Institution of Mechanical Engineers and a member of the Institution of Engineering and Technology.

On Tuesday, 26 July 2011, Ward was instrumental in saving the life of a 43-year-old man suffering a cardiac arrest at the wheel of his van in Leeds, West Yorkshire.

References 

 http://www.racecar.com/Motorsport/News/McCullagh-and-McAleer-Take-Contrasting-Porsche-Club-Rockingham-Wins/42890.htm
 http://www.porschesport.com/Strong%20performance%20by%20Strasse%20at%20Croft.html
 https://web.archive.org/web/20120314161436/http://www.tsl-timing.com/mgcc/2011/111453.pdf

External links 
 Porsche Club Motorsport
 Strasse Motorsport

1964 births
Living people
British racing drivers